Romania participated in the Junior Eurovision Song Contest from the first Contest in 2003 until 2009. Their best result came in their second participation, when Noni Răzvan Ene came fourth at the Junior Eurovision Song Contest 2004 with "Îți mulțumesc".

The Romanian broadcaster TVR hosted the 2006 Contest, where it was held at Sala Polivalentă in Bucharest on 2 December 2006.

In 2010, TVR withdrew from the Junior Eurovision Song Contest.

Participation overview

Commentators and spokespersons

Hostings

See also
 Romania in the Eurovision Song Contest
 Romania in the Türkvizyon Song Contest

References

Countries in the Junior Eurovision Song Contest
 
Junior Eurovision Song Contest